Nea Artaki is a town and a former municipality on the island Euboea, Greece. Since the 2011 local government reform it is a municipal unit, part of the municipality Chalcis. The municipal unit has an area of 23.015 km2. Nea Artaki is located north of Chalcis. The town was founded in 1923 by Greek refugees from the town of Erdek (Greek: Αρτάκη - Artaki). The Greek National Road 77 links it with Chalcis and northern Euboea.  Nea Artaki is located in a plain that is surrounded with mountains to the east and the North Euboean Gulf lies to the west. Nea Artaki is a well known tourist destination, notably for its beaches.

Historical population

See also

List of settlements in the Euboea regional unit

References

External links
Greek Travel Pages
In Greek:
vres.gr
 e-city.gr

Populated places in Euboea